Akash Modi (born May 9, 1995) is an American artistic gymnast. He represented the United States at the 2018 and the 2019 World Artistic Gymnastics Championships and was an alternate for the 2016 and 2020 Olympic teams.

Personal life
Born in Edison, New Jersey, Modi grew up in the Morganville section of Marlboro Township, New Jersey, where he attended High Technology High School, from which he graduated in 2013.

Gymnastics career
Modi competed at the 2013 Winter Cup where he won silver on parallel bars. He competed at the 2014 Winter Cup where he won gold on parallel bars. He competed at the 2016 Winter Cup where he won silver on horizontal bar and all-around. He competed at the 2017 Winter Cup where he won silver on parallel bars, horizontal bar, and all-around and bronze on floor. He competed at the 2018 Winter Cup where he won silver on floor and parallel bars and bronze in the all-around.

2020–21 
In early 2020 Modi competed at the Winter Cup where he finished 15th in the all-around.  The remainder of competitions for the year were canceled or postponed due to the COVID-19 pandemic.

Modi returned to competition at the 2021 U.S. National Championships where he finished sixth in the all-around.  As a result, he qualified to compete at the upcoming Olympic Trials.  At the Olympic Trials Modi finished sixth in the all-around.  He was named as an alternate for the Olympic team.

Competitive history

References 

1995 births
Living people
People from Edison, New Jersey
People from Marlboro Township, New Jersey
Sportspeople from Monmouth County, New Jersey
Stanford University alumni
American male artistic gymnasts
Medalists at the 2015 Summer Universiade
Universiade bronze medalists for the United States
Universiade medalists in gymnastics
Stanford Cardinal men's gymnasts